TFT may refer to:

Electronics
 Thin-film transistor, a type of transistor commonly used in flat-screen displays

Gaming
 Teamfight Tactics, an auto battler game from League of Legends developer Riot Games
 Warcraft III: The Frozen Throne, an expansion to the video game Warcraft III
 The Fantasy Trip, a role playing game designed by Steve Jackson
 Task Force Talon, a faction from the video game Act of War: Direct Action

Medicine and psychology
 Thyroid function tests, a collective term for blood tests used to check the function of the thyroid
 Thought Field Therapy, a type of Energy psychology therapy
 Trifluridine, an antiviral and anticancer medication

Music groups
 The Fire Theft, a rock band associated with Sunny Day Real Estate
 There for Tomorrow, an alternative band
 The Fabulous Thunderbirds, a blues-rock band

Organizations

United States
Task Force Tarawa, the 2nd Marine Brigade during the 2003 invasion of Iraq
Texans for Truth, an American political action group
Toys for Tots, a charitable program of the U.S. Marine Corps Reserve
UCLA School of Theater, Film and Television, California

Elsewhere
Thai Forest Tradition, a Thai lineage (or school) of Theravada Buddhism
Théâtre français de Toronto, a French-language theatre company in Toronto, Canada

Other uses
Tit for tat, equivalent retaliation, in game theory
 Ternate language, spoken on Indonesia's Maluku Islands (ISO 639-3 code: tft)
Toy Fox Terrier, a breed of small dog
The Friday Thing, a defunct UK current-affairs newsletter by The Friday Project
TFT Racing, a French racing team